William John Rogers (died April 1952), often known as Will Rogers, was a British trade unionist and political activist.

In 1890, Rogers founded the Clerks' Union, which later became a major trade union.  He became active in the Labour Party and stood in Daventry at the 1918 and 1922 United Kingdom general elections, taking second place and around 40% of the vote on each occasion.

References

Year of birth missing
1952 deaths
Trade unionists from Northamptonshire
Politicians from Northamptonshire
Labour Party (UK) parliamentary candidates